Hong Kong competed in the 2017 Asian Winter Games in Sapporo and Obihiro, Japan from February 19 to 26. The country competed in two sports (three disciplines).

Hong Kong's team consisted of 50 athletes, the largest team the nation has sent to the Asian Winter Games. These games also marked the country's debut in the women's ice hockey competition. The team also consists of 28 officials.

Ice hockey player Tony Leung was the country's flagbearer during the parade of nations at the opening ceremony.

Competitors
The following table lists the Hong Kong delegation per sport and gender.

Figure skating

Hong Kong competed in the figure skating competitions. The team consisted of four athletes.

Men
Leung Kwun-hung
Harry Lee

Women
Maisy Ma
Joanna So

Ice hockey

Hong Kong has entered a men's and women's hockey team. The men's team will compete in division one. Hong Kong's men's team finished in fifth place (9th place overall) in division 1 of the competition.

Men's tournament

Hong Kong was represented by the following 23 athletes:

Cheung Ching-ho (G)
Ho King-chi (G)
Emerson Keung (G)
Lam Chi-kin (D)
Tony Leung (D)
Julian Ma (D)
Wong Ka-ho (D)
Theophilus Wong (D)
Yannick Wong (D)
Yeung Chun-ying (D)
Howard Yuen (D)
Justin Cheng (F)
Terence Chim (F)
Terry Choi (F)
John Fu (F)
Bernard Fung (F)
Kan Siu-him (F)
Lau Chi-lok (F)
Linus Lo (F)
Herman Lui (F)
Alvin Sham (F)
Jasper Tang (F)
To Hei-yu (F)

Legend
G– Goalie D = Defense F = Forward

Women's tournament

Hong Kong made its debut in the women's ice hockey competition. Hong Kong was represented by the following 21 athletes:

Chau Nga-sze (G)
Virginia Wong (G)
Chloe Chan (D)
Kwan Yim-kuen (D)
Kwok Hoi-kei (D)
Aman Leung (D)
Adrienne Li (D)
Joey Lin (D)
Brittany Ng (D)
Monica Shum (D)
Maureen Wong (D)
Queenie Chan (F)
Joanna Chan (F)
Cheung Oi-lam (F)
Chow Suet-yee (F)
Chow Wai-yee (F)
Cindy Chu (F)
Claudia Ieong (F)
Lau Yeuk-ting (F)
Wong Tsui-yi (F)
Jacqueline Ng (F)

Legend: G = Goalie, D = Defense, F = Forward

Short track speed skating

Hong Kong is scheduled to compete in Short track speed skating. The team consists of two athletes.

Men
Sidney Chu
Kelvin Tsang

References

Nations at the 2017 Asian Winter Games
Asian Winter Games
Hong Kong at the Asian Winter Games